Carcassonne (also , , ;) is a French fortified city in the department of Aude, in the region of Occitanie. It is the prefecture of the department.

Inhabited since the Neolithic, Carcassonne is located in the plain of the Aude between historic trade routes, linking the Atlantic to the Mediterranean Sea and the Massif Central to the Pyrénées. Its strategic importance was quickly recognized by the Ancient Romans, who occupied its hilltop until the demise of the Western Roman Empire. In the fifth century, the region of Septimania was taken over by the Visigoths, who founded the city of Carcassonne in the newly established Visigothic Kingdom.

Its citadel, known as the Cité de Carcassonne, is a medieval fortress dating back to the Gallo-Roman period and restored by the theorist and architect Eugène Viollet-le-Duc in 1853. It was added to the UNESCO list of World Heritage Sites in 1997 because of the exceptional preservation and restoration of the medieval citadel. Consequently, Carcassonne relies heavily on tourism but also counts manufacturing and winemaking as some of its other key economic sectors.

Geography 
Its strategic location between the Atlantic Ocean and the Mediterranean Sea has been known since the Neolithic era. The rivers Aude, Fresquel, and the Canal du Midi flow through the town.

History 
The first signs of settlement in this region have been dated to about 3500 BC, but the hill site of Carsac—a Celtic place-name that has been retained at other sites in the south—became an important trading place in the sixth century BC. The Volcae Tectosages fortified it and made it into an oppidum, a hill fort, which is when it was named "Carsac".

The folk etymology—involving a châtelaine named Lady Carcas, a ruse ending a siege, and the joyous ringing of bells (" sona")—though memorialized in a neo-Gothic sculpture of Mme.  on a column near the Narbonne Gate, is of modern invention. The name can be derived as an augmentative of the name Carcas.

Carcassonne became strategically identified when the Romans fortified the hilltop around 100 BC and eventually made it the colonia of Julia Carsaco, later Carcaso, later Carcasum (by the process of swapping consonants known as metathesis). The main part of the lower courses of the northern ramparts dates from Gallo-Roman times. In 462 the Romans officially ceded Septimania to the Visigothic king Theodoric II who had held Carcassonne since 453. He built more fortifications at Carcassonne, which was a frontier post on the northern marches—traces of them still stand.

Theodoric is thought to have begun the predecessor of the basilica that is now dedicated to Saint Nazaire. In 508 the Visigoths successfully foiled attacks by the Frankish king Clovis I. In Francia, the Arab and Berber Muslim forces invaded the region of Septimania in 719 and deposed the local Visigothic Kingdom in 720; after the Frankish conquest of Narbonne in 759, the Muslim Arabs and Berbers were defeated by the Christian Franks and retreated to their Andalusian heartland after 40 years of occupation, and the Carolingian king Pepin the Short came up reinforced.

A medieval fiefdom, the county of Carcassonne, controlled the city and its environs. It was often united with the county of Razès. The origins of Carcassonne as a county probably lie in local representatives of the Visigoths, but the first count known by name is Bello of the time of Charlemagne. Bello founded a dynasty, the Bellonids, which would rule many honores in Septimania and Catalonia for three centuries. In 1067, Carcassonne became the property of Raimond-Bernard Trencavel, viscount of Albi and Nîmes, through his marriage with Ermengard, sister of the last count of Carcassonne. In the following centuries, the Trencavel family allied in succession with either the counts of Barcelona or of Toulouse. They built the Château Comtal and the Basilica of Saints Nazarius and Celsus. In 1096, Pope Urban II blessed the foundation stones of the new cathedral.

Carcassonne became famous for its role in the Albigensian Crusades when the city was a stronghold of Occitan Cathars. In August 1209 the crusading army of the Papal Legate, abbot Arnaud Amalric, forced its citizens to surrender. Viscount Raymond-Roger de Trencavel was imprisoned whilst negotiating his city's surrender and died in mysterious circumstances three months later in his own dungeon. The people of Carcassonne were allowed to leave—in effect, expelled from their city with nothing more than the shirt on their backs. Simon de Montfort was appointed the new viscount and added to the fortifications.

In 1240, Trencavel's son tried to reconquer his old domain but in vain. The city submitted to the rule of the kingdom of France in 1247. Carcassonne became a border fortress between France and the Crown of Aragon under the 1258 Treaty of Corbeil. King Louis IX founded the new part of the town across the river. He and his successor Philip III built the outer ramparts. Contemporary opinion still considered the fortress impregnable. During the Hundred Years' War, Edward the Black Prince failed to take the city in 1355, although his troops destroyed the Lower Town.

In 1659, the Treaty of the Pyrenees transferred the border province of Roussillon to France, and Carcassonne's military significance was reduced. Its fortifications were abandoned and the city became mainly an economic center that concentrated on the woollen textile industry, for which a 1723 source quoted by Fernand Braudel found it "the manufacturing center of Languedoc". It remained so until the Ottoman market collapsed at the end of the eighteenth century, thereafter reverting to a country town.

Historical importance 
Carcassonne was the first fortress to use hoardings in times of siege. Temporary wooden platforms and walls would be fitted to the upper walls of the fortress through square holes in the face of the wall, providing protection to defenders on the wall and allowing defenders to go out past the wall to drop projectiles on attackers at the wall beneath, acting much like permanent machicolation.

Main sights

The fortified city 

The fortified city consists essentially of a concentric design of two outer walls with 53 towers and barbicans to prevent attack by siege engines. The castle itself possesses its own drawbridge and ditch leading to a central keep. The walls consist of towers built over quite a long period. One section is Roman and is notably different from the medieval walls, with the tell-tale red brick layers and the shallow pitch terracotta tile roofs. One of these towers housed the Catholic Inquisition in the 13th century and is still known as "The Inquisition Tower".

Carcassonne was demilitarised under Napoleon Bonaparte and the Restoration, and the fortified cité of Carcassonne fell into such disrepair that the French government decided that it should be demolished. A decree to that effect that was made official in 1849 caused an uproar. The antiquary and mayor of Carcassonne, Jean-Pierre Cros-Mayrevieille, and the writer Prosper Mérimée, the first inspector of ancient monuments, led a campaign to preserve the fortress as a historical monument. Later in the year the architect Eugène Viollet-le-Duc, already at work restoring the Basilica of Saints Nazarius and Celsus, was commissioned to renovate the place.

In 1853, work began with the west and southwest walls, followed by the towers of the porte Narbonnaise and the principal entrance to the cité. The fortifications were consolidated here and there, but the chief attention was paid to restoring the roofing of the towers and the ramparts, where Viollet-le-Duc ordered the destruction of structures that had encroached against the walls, some of them of considerable age. Viollet-le-Duc left copious notes and drawings upon his death in 1879 when his pupil Paul Boeswillwald and, later, the architect Nodet continued the rehabilitation of Carcassonne.

The restoration was strongly criticized during Viollet-le-Duc's lifetime. Fresh from work in the north of France, he made the error of using slate (when there was no slate to be quarried around) instead of terracotta tiles. The slate roofs were claimed to be more typical of northern France, as was the addition of the pointed tips to the roofs.

Lower town 

The ville basse dates to the Late Middle Ages. Founded as a settlement of the expelled inhabitants of the town some time after the crusades, it has been the economic heart of the city for centuries. Though once walled, most of the walls in this portion of the town are no longer intact. The Carcassonne Cathedral is in this part of the town.

Other 

Another bridge, Pont Marengo, crosses the Canal du Midi and provides access to the railway station. The Lac de la Cavayère has been created as a recreational lake; it is about five minutes from the city centre by automobile.

Further sights include:
 The Basilica of Saints Nazarius and Celsus
 The Carcassonne Cathedral
 Church of St. Vincent

Climate 
Carcassonne has a humid subtropical climate (Köppen climate classification: Cfa), though with noticeable hot-summer mediterranean climate influence (Köppen climate classification: Csa), a climate which is more typical of southern France, with moderately wet and mild winters coupled with summers averaging above  during daytime with low rainfall.

Carcassonne, along with the French Mediterranean coastline, can be subject to intense thunderstorms and torrential rains at late summers and early autumns. The Carcassonne region can be flooded in such events, the last of which happened on 14–15 October 2018.

Population

Economy 
The newer part (Ville Basse) of the city on the other side of the Aude river (which dates back to the Middle Ages, after the crusades) manufactures shoes, rubber and textiles. It is also the center of a major AOC winegrowing region. A major part of its income comes from the tourism connected to the fortifications (Cité) and from boats cruising on the Canal du Midi. Carcassonne is also home to the MKE Performing Arts Academy. Carcassonne receives about three million visitors annually.

Transport 
In the late 1990s, Carcassonne airport started taking budget flights to and from European airports and by 2009 had regular flight connections with Porto, Bournemouth, Cork, Dublin, Frankfurt-Hahn, London-Stansted, Liverpool, East Midlands, Glasgow-Prestwick and Charleroi.

The Gare de Carcassonne railway station offers direct connections to Toulouse, Narbonne, Perpignan, Paris, Marseille and several regional destinations. The A61 motorway connects Carcassonne with Toulouse and Narbonne.

Education 
École nationale de l'aviation civile

Language 
French is spoken. Historically, the language spoken in Carcassonne and throughout Languedoc-Roussillon was not French but Occitan.

Sport 
In July 2021, Carcassonne was the finish city for stage 13, and the starting point of stage 14, of the 2021 Tour de France. It was at the finish in Carcassonne that Mark Cavendish tied the record for most Tour de France stage wins (34) held by Eddy Merckx. Carcassonne was the finish city for stage 15, and the starting point of stage 16, of the 2018 Tour de France. Previously it was the starting point for stage 11 of the 2016 Tour de France, the starting point for a stage in the 2004 Tour de France, and a stage finish in the 2006 Tour de France.

As in the rest of the southwest of France, rugby union is popular in Carcassonne. The city is represented by Union Sportive Carcassonnaise, known locally simply as USC. The club has a proud history, having played in the French Championship Final in 1925, and currently competes in Pro D2, the second tier of French rugby.

Rugby league is also played, by the AS Carcassonne club. They are involved in the Elite One Championship. Puig Aubert is the most notable rugby league player to come from the Carcassonne club. There is a bronze statue of him outside the Stade Albert Domec at which the city's teams in both codes play.

Arts 
In May 2018, as the project "Concentric, eccentric" by French-Swiss artist Felice Varini, large yellow concentric circles were mounted on the monument as part of the 7th edition of "IN SITU, Heritage and contemporary art", a summer event in the Occitanie / Pyrenees-Mediterranean region focusing on the relationship between modern art and architectural heritage. This monumental work was done to celebrate the 20th anniversary of Carcassonne's inscription on the World Heritage List of UNESCO.

Exceptional in its size and its visibility and use of architectural space, the exhibit extended across the western front of the fortifications of the city. The work could be fully perceived only in front of the Porte d'Aude at the pedestrian route from the Bastide. The circles of yellow colour consist of thin, painted aluminium sheets, spread like waves of time and space, fragmenting and recomposing the geometry of the circles on the towers and curtain walls of the fortifications. The work was visible from May to September 2018 only.

In culture 
 The French poet Gustave Nadaud made Carcassonne famous as a city. He wrote a poem about a man who dreamed of seeing but could not see before he died. His poem inspired many others and was translated into English several times. Georges Brassens has sung a musical version of the poem. Lord Dunsany wrote a short story "Carcassonne" (in A Dreamer's Tales) as did William Faulkner.
On 6 March 2000 France issued a stamp commemorating the fortress of Carcassonne.
 The history of Carcassonne is re-told in the novels of the Languedoc Trilogy Labyrinth, Sepulchre and Citadel by Kate Mosse. Together with Puivert and Toulouse, it features strongly in her 2018 novel "The Burning Chambers".
 The board game series Carcassonne is named after this town, and depicts the architecture of the region.
 Portions of the 1991 film Robin Hood: Prince of Thieves were shot in and around Carcassonne.
 A 1993 album by Stephan Eicher was named Carcassonne.
 In the one-man show Sea Wall, starring Andrew Scott, Carcassonne is mentioned frequently as a setting.
 Carcassonne is also the name of a major settlement and sub-faction in the Southern-most part of the quasi-medieval-French faction Brettonia in the tabletop game Warhammer Fantasy Battles and subsequently the video game series Total War: Warhammer.

Personalities 
Paul Lacombe, French composer, b. 1837
Théophile Barrau, French sculptor, b. 1848
Paul Sabatier, French chemist, co-recipient of the Nobel Prize in Chemistry, b. 1854
Henry d'Estienne, French painter, b. 1872
Suzanne Sarroca, French operatic soprano, b. 1927
Gilbert Benausse, French rugby league footballer, b. 1932
Alain Colmerauer, French computer scientist, inventor of the programming language Prolog, b. 1941
Michael Martchenko, French-born Canadian illustrator, b. 1942
Maurice Sarrail, French soldier, General of Division during the First World War, b. 1856
David Ferriol, French rugby league player, b. 1979
Olivia Ruiz, French pop singer, b. 1980
Fabrice Estebanez, French rugby union player, b. 1981

International relations 

Carcassonne is twinned with:
 Eggenfelden, Germany
 Baeza, Spain
 Tallinn, Estonia

References

External links 

 Official website of the city of Carcassonne 
 Cité de Carcassonne, from the French Ministry of Culture
 Multimedia Resources of the city of Carcassonne

 
Communes of Aude
Cities in Occitania (administrative region)
Prefectures in France
Catharism
Fortified settlements
Medieval defences
Populated places established in the 4th millennium BC
4th-millennium BC establishments
Landmarks in France
World Heritage Sites in France
Languedoc
Monuments of the Centre des monuments nationaux